Halidou Malam (born 8 July 1976 in Cameroon) is a Cameroonian retired professional footballer who is last known to have been a member of South Africa's Kaizer Chiefs in the 1999/2000 season.

South Africa

Replacing Pollen Ndlanya at Kaizer Chiefs in the 1999-00 season, Malam was said to have looked somnolent on the field, failing to score in any of his six five starts and one substitute appearance there, despite starting his first outing confronting Tembisa Classic.

References

External links 
 Was Halidou Malan The Worst Ever Foreign Striker To Play In The PSL?
 FIFA Profile

Living people
1976 births
Kaizer Chiefs F.C. players
Cameroonian footballers
Cameroonian expatriate footballers
Association football forwards
Bandung Raya players
Expatriate soccer players in South Africa
Expatriate footballers in Indonesia